Arthur Township is a civil township in Cass County, in the U.S. state of North Dakota.

History
Arthur Township was established in the 1880s.

References

Townships in Cass County, North Dakota